Hiko is a small, agrarian community in the Tonopah Basin on State Route 318 in Lincoln County, Nevada, United States. It is a census-designated place, with a population of 119 at the 2010 census.

Demographics

Description

The first permanent settlement at Hiko was made in 1853. Hiko was the county seat of Lincoln County from 1867 to 1871 and a few hundred residents lived nearby, due largely to silver mines in the area. Today, the area is a farming and ranching area, and not much remains of the old town except the cemetery, some mill ruins and a red rock building that was a general store. Although populated, Hiko appears on at least two ghost town lists. Most of the residents of Hiko own farms or ranches, and little to no industrial activity takes place there. In 1871 Hiko was replaced as the county seat of Lincoln County with the current seat, Pioche.

The Hiko and Crystal Springs provide a large supply of water for the Hiko farms and ranches.

Climate
Hiko has a cold desert climate (Köppen: BWk). Summers are hot, and winters feature cool days with cold nights.

See also
 
 List of census-designated places in Nevada
 Weepah Spring Wilderness

References

External links
 
 Ghosttowns.com
 History of Lincoln County
 Ghost Town Seekers

Census-designated places in Nevada
Unincorporated communities in Nevada